is a 1986 short experimental film by Japanese underground filmmaker Shozin Fukui. The film follows a young woman on the Tokyo subway, who may be possessed.

Release
Despite being originally made in 1986, Gerorisuto was not officially released in Japan until the early 1990s.

The film appeared in the United States as a special feature on the Unearthed Films DVD release of Fukui's Rubber's Lover in 2004. The DVD has since been discontinued.

References

External links
 

1986 films
1980s Japanese-language films
Japanese short films
Films directed by Shozin Fukui
1986 short films
Japanese avant-garde and experimental films
1980s avant-garde and experimental films
1980s Japanese films